Panguitch is a city in and the county seat of Garfield County, Utah, United States. The population was 1,520 at the 2010 census, and was estimated in 2018 to be 1,691. The name Panguitch comes from a Southern Paiute word meaning “Big Fish,” likely named after the plentiful nearby lakes hosting rainbow trout year-round.

Geography

Panguitch is located on the western edge of Garfield County at  (37.822234, -112.434650), in the valley of the Sevier River. U.S. Route 89 passes through the center of town, leading north  to Junction and south  to Orderville. Utah State Route 143 leads southwest from Panguitch  to Panguitch Lake in Dixie National Forest.

Climate
Panguitch has a cool semi-arid climate (Köppen BSk) with summers featuring hot afternoons and cold mornings, and cold, dry winters. The high altitude and relatively high latitude means that mornings are cold throughout the year and freezing for most of it: between 1971 and 2000 an average of 227.7 mornings fell below freezing and 16.5 mornings fell to or below . Maxima, however, can be expected to top freezing on all but fourteen afternoons during an average year, and the winters are so dry that snowfall is light, averaging only  with median cover never much above . The most snowfall in a month has been  in the famously cold January 1949, and the most in a season  from July 1951 to June 1952. Mild, dry winters like 1976/1977 and 1980/1981 can in contrast see negligible snowfall for an entire season.

In a manner more akin to Arizona than northern Utah, most of the limited precipitation occurs during the July to October monsoon season, but Garfield County is usually too far north to receive the monsoon's full benefit.

History
Panguitch was first settled in March 1864, when Jens Nielsen, a Danish convert to the Church of Jesus Christ of Latter-day Saints, led a group of 54 families eastward from Parowan and Beaver to the Sevier River. At a crisis point, seven men left the community to seek flour and foodstuffs from surrounding communities. Heavy snow forced the abandonment of wagons and teams, and the men finished their rescue mission on foot, reportedly by laying one quilt after another upon the snow to maintain their footing.

Due to the Black Hawk War to the north, church officials decided the settlers should abandon the area, and they did so in May 1865. Five years later, Brigham Young decided it was time to try again, and new settlers arrived in 1871. The settlers built a fort, where they lived until more housing could be built and the fields could be replanted. They harvested a lot of grain, so much that they built a grist mill. The settlers cut lumber from the forests and processed it in sawmills and shingle mills. They had a tannery to produce leather from local cattle. The settlers used kilns to process local clay into rose-colored bricks. Workers were paid in bricks, which they used to build their own houses. Rose-colored brick houses still stand in Panguitch.

Panguitch was incorporated in 1899. A social hall was built in 1900, but it burned down in 1920. A new social hall replaced it, and it continues to stand, as the Panguitch Playhouse. The Panguitch Indian School operated from 1904 to 1909, primarily housing Utah Paiutes and Kaibab Paiutes. Students as young as six were taken from their tribe and forced to live at the school overseen by the federal government. Some children were taken at gunpoint from St. George and Moccasin, Arizona.

Timber and livestock production were successful industries in Panguitch until the economic shifts following World War I.

Following the establishment of Bryce Canyon National Park and the designation of nearby areas as national forests, tourism has since played a major role in the local economy.

The National Register of Historic Places designated the entire town the Panguitch Historic District in 2007.

Demographics

As of the census of 2000, there were 1,623 people, 502 households, and 392 families residing in the city. The population density was 1,194.0 people per square mile (460.8/km2). There were 620 housing units at an average density of 456.1 per square mile (176.0/km2). The racial makeup of the city was 94.02% White, 0.49% African American, 2.46% Native American, 0.12% Asian, 2.16% from other races, and 0.74% from two or more races. Hispanic or Latino of any race were 2.90% of the population.

There were 502 households, out of which 40.4% had children under the age of 18 living with them, 67.3% were married couples living together, 8.4% had a female householder with no husband present, and 21.9% were non-families. 19.1% of all households were made up of individuals, and 11.2% had someone living alone who was 65 years of age or older. The average household size was 3.05 and the average family size was 3.55.

In the city, the population was spread out, with 32.8% under the age of 18, 8.9% from 18 to 24, 23.2% from 25 to 44, 21.0% from 45 to 64, and 14.1% who were 65 years of age or older. The median age was 32 years. For every 100 females, there were 106.8 males. For every 100 females age 18 and over, there were 111.0 males.

The median income for a household in the city was $33,500, and the median income for a family was $39,904. Males had a median income of $28,259 versus $19,375 for females. The per capita income for the city was $12,439. About 6.2% of families and 9.6% of the population were below the poverty line, including 14.8% of those under age 18 and 6.6% of those age 65 or over.

Transportation
U.S. Highway 89 runs through Panguitch from Circleville in the north to Kanab in the south. State Route 143 runs south to Panguitch Lake.

In popular culture
In the science-fiction film Contact (1997), a fictional religious fanatic and suicide bomber named Joseph, played by Jake Busey, filmed his explanation for his death in a hotel in Panguitch.

Notable person
 Wayne Owens, Democratic Congressman who was born in Panguitch.

See also

 List of cities in Utah
 Panguitch Lake

References

External links

 City of Panguitch official website

 
Cities in Garfield County, Utah
Cities in Utah
County seats in Utah
Populated places established in 1864
1864 establishments in Utah Territory